Lucie Šafářová was the defending champion, having won the event in 2012. She successfully defended her title, defeating Alexandra Cadanțu in the final, 3–6, 6–1, 6–1.

Seeds

Main draw

Finals

Top half

Bottom half

External links 
 Main draw

Sparta Prague Open - Singles
WTA Prague Open
2013 in Czech tennis